Immanuel Episcopal Church may refer to:

in the United States;
(by state)
Immanuel Episcopal Church on the Green, 1703 church in New Castle, Delaware
Immanuel Episcopal Church (Winona, Mississippi), listed on the NRHP in Mississippi
Immanuel Episcopal Church (Bellows Falls, Vermont), where Carlton Chase was rector
Immanuel Episcopal Church (Mechanicsville, Virginia), NRHP-listed